Pietro Barrati (born 28 October 1898, date of death unknown) was an Italian racing cyclist. He rode in the 1925 Tour de France.

References

1898 births
Year of death missing
Italian male cyclists
Place of birth missing